Esa Pietilä is a Finnish saxophonist and composer (b. 1964) who works diversely on the field of contemporary music. He studied saxophone and composition in Sibelius- Academy jazz department in Helsinki and privately in US with David Liebman. In his home country, the Yrjö Jazz award 2016 was given to him for his original, genre-defying work in the field of avant-garde jazz.

Career 

Esa Pietilä started his career as a jazz musician and later on has expanded his expression to many different musical genres. He has performed with his jazz groups e.g. Liberty Ship, Esa Pietilä 3, with his duo collaborations with contemporary classical & new music chamber musicians, as soloist for chamber orchestras, other larger ensembles and performing totally free improvisations at his solo concerts. Pietilä has worked e.g. with conductors Esa-Pekka Salonen, Santtu-Matias Rouvali, Ville Matvejeff, Tibor Boganyi, Hossein Piskar, Jan Söderblom and Erkki Lasonpalo, with Avanti! Chamber Orchestra. Pietilä has premiered the saxophone concerto of Kalevi Aho, Eero Hämeenniemi and Pietilä´s concerto "Graffiti Play" for chamber orchestra & contemporary jazz trio and Pulses, Waves & Dialoques for tenor saxophone & string orchestra. His collaborators on the field of jazz have been Paal Nilssen-Love, Harvey Sorgen, Michael Jefry Stevens, Mathias Eick, Jeff Siegel, Karl Berger, Mark Helias, Brian Melvin, Heiri Kaenzig, Christoph Baumann, Baenz Öster, Franziska Baumann, Mike Nock, Ron McClure, Claudio Fasoli, Anders Begcrantz, Odean Pope, Hilmar Jensson, Raoul Björkenheim. Markku Ounaskari, Ulf Krokfors, Iro Haarla.

List of works as a composer 

 "Graffiti Play", concerto for Tenor Saxophone, contemporary Jazz Trio (ts, bs, drs) & chamber orchestra . F.P. 2014 by Esa-Pekka Salonen & Avanti! Chamber Orchestra
 Pulses, Waves & Dialoques for tenor saxophone & string orchestra, F.P 2017 by St. Michel Strings & Pietilä 
 Blue, Black & Sun (string quartet No. 2), 14:27´, Fennica Gehrman, F.P. feb. 2022 by SKATTA String Quartet
 Blazing Flames for tenor saxophone & string quartet, 28´, (2018). F.P. 2018 with KAMUS String quartet & Pietilä
 Glow for tenor saxophone, acc., perc & live-electronics, 16´. (2018), F.P. 2018 with Veli Kujala (acc), Janne Tuomi (drs & perc.) & Pietilä
 Zefyros flute sonata, 9:14´, F.P with Sami Junnonen (fl) & Tuomas Turriago (p), 8th Apr. 2022, Tampere Biannale
 Uirapuru for tenor saxophone & male choir (40 voices and up), 11´, (2017) F.P. 2017 by Akademiska Sångföreningen & Pietilä
 Triptych for tenor saxophone & church organ, 18´, F.P. 2016 by Pétur Sakari (pipe organ) & Esa Pietilä
 Saturn – Fantasy for tenor saxophone & church organ, 16´, F.P. by 2012 by Pétur Sakari & Esa Pietilä
 Asterion, for 8 -piece chamber group, F.P. by Zagros Ensemble 2014
 HUNT! for Percussion Quintet & Tenor Saxophone, F.P by Osuma Ensemble 2016
 Hyperhelium, for Chamber sextet &  Tenor Saxophone, F.P. by Tampere Raw Sextet
 Seven For Amazonas, for Recorder Quartet, F.P. (to be come 2017) by Bravade Quartet
 Brisk, for cello & marimba, F.P. by Eeva Rysä & Kazutaka Morita 2016
 Seppo´s Hammer, for chamber strings & jazz quintet 
 People People, for chamber strings & jazz quintet 
 Ahead - Electric Microland, for tenor saxophone, accordion & live-electronics
 Colors of Liberation, for tenor saxophone 
 Orbits, for electric kantele & tenor saxophone
 Three Strides of Light, for solo piano
 Lake of Clang, for saxophone quartet (SATB)
 Before Moon, for Big Band
 Labyrinth, for big band
 Big Fun, for 12 musicians
 Code Red, for Big Band
 House of Bells, for solo piano
 Mirage, for string quartet
 Tricks, for Big Band
 Turms, for Big Band
 Welho, for 12- piece jazz orchestra
 various pieces for jazz groups
 various chamber group pieces for mixed setups
 various solo pieces for saxophone

Discography 

 Liberty Ship — The Wide Open Suite & Noises At Sea
 Mart Soo & Esa Pietilä  — Lighthouse Stories
 Solo Saxophone - Times & Spaces
 Liberty Ship — Approaching
 Esa Pietilä & Jeff Siegel — Out doors 
 Brain Inventory Trio  — The Wall 
 Esa Pietilä, solo saxophone — Karhea 
 Esa Pietilä Trio — Travel of Fulica atra 
 Johannes Mössinger & Esa Pietilä— Natural Flow
 Esa Pietilä Trio — Direct 
 Esa Pietilä Quintet— Fastjoik
 The Case — Codes

References 
 official website
 Musicfinland
 Jazzzfinland
 Couleurs Nordiques

1964 births
Finnish saxophonists
Male saxophonists
Living people
21st-century saxophonists
21st-century male musicians